Mitrella chantalae is a species of sea snail, a marine gastropod mollusk in the family Columbellidae, the dove snails.

Description
The length of the shell attains 11.3 mm.

Distribution
This marine species occurs off Madagascar.

References

 Bozzetti L. (2006) Tre nuove Columbellidae (Gastropoda: Hypsogastropoda: Columbellidae: Pyreninae) dal Madagascar Meridionale. Malacologia Mostra Mondiale 53: 6–8.

chantalae
Gastropods described in 2006